Dolinsky District is an administrative district (raion) of Sakhalin Oblast, Russia; one of the seventeen in the oblast. Municipally, it is incorporated as Dolinsky Urban Okrug. It is located in the southeast of the oblast. Its administrative center is the town of Dolinsk. Population (excluding the administrative center):

References

Notes

Sources

Districts of Sakhalin Oblast